Montague Gluckstein (18 July 1854 – 7 October 1922) was a director of Salmon & Gluckstein tobacco merchants, and one of the founders of J. Lyons and Co., a restaurant chain, food manufacturing, and hotel conglomerate created in 1884 that dominated British mass-catering in the first half of the twentieth century.

Early life
Montague Gluckstein was the son of Samuel Gluckstein, the founder of Salmon & Gluckstein.

Career
He succeeded his brother Isidore Gluckstein as chairman of J. Lyons and Co.

Personal life
He married Matilda Franks (b. 1861) in 1884.

His son Samuel Montague Gluckstein (1884–1928) was a director of J. Lyons and Co.

His son Isidore Montague Gluckstein (1890–1975) became managing director, then chairman, then president of J. Lyons and Co.

References

1854 births
1922 deaths
British Jews
British merchants
Montague